Nueva Pompeya (Spanish for New Pompei), often loosely referred to as Pompeya, is a neighbourhood in the city of Buenos Aires, Argentina. Located in the South side, it has long been one of the city's proletarian districts steeped in the tradition of tango and one where many of the first tangos were written and performed.

A neighborhood local, the legendary tango composer Homero Manzi, set a very popular tango (Sur) in Nueva Pompeya, describing a melancholy landscape (“Pompeya and beyond the flood”) that, even today, defines much of the district's physionomy.

History
Nueva Pompeya was given its name by the faithful of the Virgin of the Rosary of Pompeya, raised in 1900 by Capuchin monks. Until then, it was often referred to as the "district of the Frogs."  The term “frog”, in the Buenos Aires vernacular, refers to the "street-wise" man, and, indeed, many of Nueva Pompeya's youth are thought of this way to the present day.

Nueva Pompeya was largely built on the alluvial plain north of the Riachuelo and, at the time, it was subject to frequent flooding. It was consequently thinly populated, and was notorious for its poverty and high crime rate.

Until the 1930s, when industries began setting up in the area, most locals worked in the large slaughterhouse in neighboring Parque Patricios. Sáenz Avenue, which leads through Nueva Pompeya, is still sometimes referred to as "the street of bones", for the many cattle that died on their way to the slaughterhouse, early in the twentieth century.

The area was also well known for its many pulperías, seedy saloons frequented by cutlers, carriers and guitarists. Two are still preserved as museums: La Blanqueada and the Maria Adelia Pulperia, which had a patio so large that it served as a field hospital during the 1880 conflict between the Nation and secessionist factions in Buenos Aires.

Economy

Over the course of the twentieth century the district developed its present urban aspect. In 1938 a bridge adorned with arcs and columns of rubblework in neo-colonial style was opened on the Matanza river. A district landmark, it was first called Valentín Alsina Bridge and renamed after de facto President José Félix Uriburu following his death in 1932. The original name was restored in 2002. The district's residential areas are mostly one-story rowhouses.

Nueva Pompeya is served by a number of community services. In 1940 the Working Catholic Circle opened on a  lot on 1342 Sáenz Avenue, and in 1965 the city opened a Natatorium (indoor pool) of 27 meters in length. The Social and Cultural Complex of Nueva Pompeya, founded by Carlos Valdisseri, one of the founders of the Working Catholic Circle, was until recently directed by his son, Father Jorge Valdisseri, who died at the age of 91.

The district is also home to one of the city's largest slums (villas miserias, in the Argentine vernacular). Swollen by migration from Argentina's impoverished rural areas in the north and from Argentina's northern neighbor, Bolivia, its inhabitants are mostly manual laborers, particularly seamstresses.

The district is crossed by numerous divided along the middle by Sáenz Avenue, which unites Nueva Pompeya with Valentin Alsina, in the Province of Buenos Aires. In both, metallurgical and meat-packing plants dominated the labor market until they began to close after 1980, often as a result of economic policies that adversely affected production, rather than as a result of shifting markets. Nevertheless, many factories remain and others still function as warehouses and factory outlets.

Next to Doctor Antonio Sáenz railway station, on the corner of Sáenz and Moreno Avenues, the Buenos Aires Bird Fair operates every Sunday. The fair is renowned for its variety of songbirds, particularly canoras.

The Chinese Bar, on Beazley Street, is a representative institution of the district. It was installed by tango vocalist Jorge “Chino” Garcés and is frequented tango fans in search of an authentic atmosphere. Among the bar's regulars is the Spanish actor José Sacristán, who divides his time between Buenos Aires and Spain.

The tango heritage of the district is owed to a great extent to lyricist Homero Manzi. In the corner of Tabaré and Del Barco Centenera Streets, mentioned in the tango Mano Blanca (“White Hand”), a mural containing the lyrics of the tango memorializes Manzi; but, mainly, it emphasizes that Nueva Pompeya is a place of legend in tango.

Neighborhood artists designed an emblem for Nueva Pompeya. It shows the church, Alsina bridge, bandoneón and the figure of an intellectual who tightens with his hand, in greeting signal, the arm of a worker.

The district has an extraordinary tradition of social assistance societies, like the Nueva Pompeya Social and Cultural Complex, formed by employees, retailers and workers to encourage improvements to the area habitat. Since 2000 they have helped address the needs of Nueva Pompeya's many needy with community dining halls, among them Juanita's Little House on 1340 Sáenz Avenue. Neighborhood activist Juana Isabel Fernandez, a worker made unemployed during the economic crisis at that time, opened the center and continues to run it with the help of the Nueva Pompeya Social and Cultural Complex and other locals.

Nueva Pompeya: true cradle of the Tango

The provident arrival of European immigrants after 1880 practically reinvented Buenos Aires. They mostly settled in the Southern areas of the city where today many of their descendants remain. In addition to the district of Nueva Pompeya, they made homes in the districts of La Boca and Barracas, where they often lived in precarious houses they built themselves. As they initiated their new lives in the South American continent, they developed a distinct culture grounded in Europe and, still, all their own. In that lay the origins of tango.

Tango was at first often danced (or, moved to) without a partner along the borders of the Riachuelo. First performed where the Alsina Bridge is today located, it gained national and, after 1930, international popularity. It was first reportedly danced by pairs in a tango hall located in the corner of Corrales St. and La Plata Avenue, bordering the district of Nueva Pompeya. Over the years numerous tango halls such as the historic Chinese Bar opened and now-legendary names, such as Homero Manzi, created much of their best work there, making Nueva Pompeya the true cradle of tango.

Church of the Rosary of Nueva Pompeya

According to account history, in the city of Pompeii, (Italy), recently sanctified Bartolo Longo noticed a deteriorated portrait on the verge of being disposed of by incineration; without knowing whose portrait it was, he became enamored with it while observing the burning canvas. The portrait was of the Virgin of Rosario, flanked by Santo Domingo and St. Catherine of Siena.

Becoming a fervent devotee, he began to spread its cult and years later, he migrated to Argentina, where he settled in a riverbank area on the Buenos Aires southside and preached the virtue of the "Virgin of the Rosary of Pompeya" to all and sundry. The then-undeveloped area soon became Nueva Pompeya and the saints in the portrait soon graced the names of two of the area's main streets. On May 14, 1896, the first stone is blessed for the construction of a chapel on land donated by the ladies of St. Vincent de Paul of the parish of neighboring San Cristóbal.

Its construction, directed by the architect and painter Augusto César Ferrari, proceeded rapidly and the Church of the Rosary of Nueva Pompeya was consecrated on June 29, 1900, becoming a parish in 1905.

This house of worship is very distinctive in the area with its Gothic Revival architecture, a style that became popular in other areas of Buenos Aires. Dominated by a single tower, the large windows on the nave decorated with wonderful stained-glass windows of German origin in the form of pointed arcs that represent the fifteen mysteries of the Saint Rosary. Small lateral towers were forged out of iron, as was the ornate main portal.

Inside, oil portraits of 19th century merchant clippers and historical events line the walls and religious figures grace the main hall, accented also by religious statues. In the centre of the patio there is a bronze monument to the Virgin of Pompeii. Several portions of the church were built with rubble from the A.D. 79 destruction of the namesake city; the church was expanded in the 1920s to accommodate the growing numbers of faithful.

The church, in addition, exhibits an ornate wall clock imported by Father Agustín de Pamplona from Spain in 1923. Not until 1935 however did bells begin to sound at the Church, after their installation by local expert watchmaker Enrique Borneman. The Church of the Rosary of Nueva Pompeya remains among the most visited and architecturally significant in Buenos Aires.

Neighbourhoods of Buenos Aires